The Mostar derby (Bosnian: Mostarski gradski derbi) is a football rivalry in Mostar, Bosnia and Herzegovina between HŠK Zrinjski and FK Velež. The derby took place for the first time in 1922 and is the oldest major football derby in Bosnia and Herzegovina.

Both Mostar clubs are among the oldest in the country. HŠK Zrinjski was formed in 1905 while FK Velež was formed in 1922. However, the clubs had vastly different histories. Zrinjski was a reasonably successful club in the first half of the century, but was banned by communist Yugoslav authorities for competing in the 1. HNL under the Ustaše regime during World War II. At this point its records, along with those of other Croatian clubs, were destroyed. On the other hand, FK Velež thrived during the Yugoslav communist period, winning the Yugoslav Cup in 1981 and 1986.

After the independence of Bosnia and Herzegovina, Zrinjski was reestablished. At the same time, war broke out in the county. Over the course of the war and in its aftermath Mostar became a divided city with the Croats holding the west side and the Bosniaks the east, with those remaining Serbs living in the east as well. Zrinjski took over Velež's Bijeli Brijeg Stadium, as it was located deep inside the informal Croat territory of the Federation of Bosnia and Herzegovina, thus forcing Velež to move to Vrapčići stadium (later renamed to Rođeni Stadium).

The two clubs did not meet until 2000 for their first game. This happened because the nation's three ethnic groups each ran their own parallel leagues up until that point, with Velež in the Bosnian First League and Zrinjski in the First League of Herzeg-Bosnia.

Results

Derby from 1922–1939
1. September 1922; Mostar: Velež – Zrinjski 2:1
2. 8 September 1922; Mostar: Velež – Zrinjski 1:0
3. 13 April 1923; Mostar: Zrinjski – Velež 2:0
4. 29 April 1923; Mostar: Velež – Zrinjski 2:0
5. 1 May 1923; Mostar: Velež – Zrinjski 2:2
6. 15 July 1923; Mostar: Zrinjski – Velež 3:0
7. 1923; Mostar: Zrinjski – Velež 4:0
8. 11 November 1923; Mostar: Zrinjski – Velež 3:0
9. 31 August 1924; Mostar: Zrinjski – Velež 1:0
10. 25 July 1928; Sarajevo: Zrinjski – Velež 4:0
11. 26 July 1931; Mostar: Zrinjski – Velež 5:1
12. 7 January 1934; Mostar: Velež – Zrinjski 2:1
13. 25 February 1934; Mostar: Velež – Zrinjski 2:1
14. December 1934; Mostar: Velež – Zrinjski 2:1
15. 14 April 1935; Mostar: Zrinjski – Velež 3:1
16. 6 March 1938; Mostar: Velež – Zrinjski 4:2
17. 1938; Mostar: Zrinjski – Velež 1:0
18. 12 February 1939; Mostar: Velež – Zrinjski 2:1
19. 19 March 1939; Mostar: Zrinjski – Velež 4:2

From 17 May 1931 until 19 March 1939, 16 championship matches had been played between the two teams. Velež won 8 matches while Zrinjski won 4. No further information is available.

Modern derby

1 The match was abandoned after the hooligans of Zrinjski stormed the pitch and started chasing Velež players with various items. The field storm took place in the last minutes of the game just after Velež scored for 0–1 against their city rivals. The disciplinary and contest commission decided to award a 0–3 win to Velež, suspended "Bijeli Brijeg", Zrinjski home stadium, for 5 matches and punished Zrinjski with a fine.

All competitions

The Mostar derby is currently played three times a year in the Premier League, but they may also play against one another in other competitions. There are also friendly matches and games played in various tournaments. Although these games are not included in official statistics.

Head-to-head league ranking in Bosnia and Herzegovina

• Total: FK Velež 2 times higher, HŠK Zrinjski 20 times higher.
Source: rsssf.com

References

External links

Mostar derby at footballderbies.com
SportSport.ba
Derbi kojem se gubi trag at telesport.telegram.hr

Football derbies in Bosnia and Herzegovina
Derby